The Wright Pulsar was a single-decker bus body built on the VDL SB200 single-decker bus chassis by Wrightbus between 2006 and 2014.

A total of 639 Pulsars were built. Arriva was the main customer, with large numbers entering service at its Kent Thameside, North West, Midlands and Yorkshire divisions. First London purchased eight hydrogen-powered Pulsars. Additionally a number of independent operators also purchased Pulsars. A double-decker version of the Pulsar was also produced as the Pulsar Gemini.

First generation (2006–2013)

The Pulsar was launched at the 2006 Euro Bus Expo as the replacement for the Commander. It was also intended to replace the VDL SB120 based Cadet midibus; however, no shorter Pulsars were built. Of the 114 produced, all bar seven entered service with Arriva.

First London purchased eight hydrogen-powered Pulsar bodied VDL SB200s for use on route RV1 between 2010 and 2013. The hydrogen fuel pods are fitted to the whole length of the roof on top of the buses.

Second generation (2009–2014)
The second generation Pulsar, known as the Pulsar 2, was launched in 2009. The Pulsar 2 features facelifted front and rear ends to match the new Eclipse 2. 

The first examples were delivered to Arriva's North East and North West divisions in 2009. Of the 525 produced, Arriva purchased 462. The final two Pulsar 2s were delivered to Claribels Coaches of Birmingham in April 2014.

References

External links

Fuel cell buses
Low-entry buses
Low-floor buses
Vehicles introduced in 2006
Pulsar